Georgi Manev (15 January 1884 – 15 July 1965) was a Bulgarian physicist, founder of the Sofia University Department of Theoretical Physics, rector of Sofia University (1936–37) and education minister of Bulgaria (1938). His work, mostly known as the Manev field, is used today in aerospace science.

The articles he published in the 1920s have been noticed by Yusuke Hagihara and have been further analysed by Florin Diacu and co-workers.

Letter from Albert Einstein
Manev's gravitational theory ran counter to Albert Einstein’s theory of relativity. Einstein's less-than-glowing assessment of Manev’s theory had complicated his colleague’s prospects for a full professorship at Sofia University. In July 1929, Einstein wrote an apologetic letter to Manev, offering to help make the situation “good again.”

The typewritten letter, signed “A. Einstein,” belongs to Manev's family and was subject of an art restoration project at the Winterthur/University of Delaware Program in Art Conservation (WUDPAC). The letter was creased, partly from being folded, mailed, and tucked into a book for safekeeping during World War II. The creases were retained, removing the adhesive tape without damaging the typed words on the paper.

References

1884 births
1965 deaths
Bulgarian physicists
People from Veliko Tarnovo
Academic staff of Sofia University
Rectors of Sofia University